Testarossa is a collaborative studio album by Yoni Wolf and Serengeti, as Yoni & Geti. It was released on Joyful Noise Recordings on May 6, 2016. Based on a script the two wrote together on tour, it is a concept album, telling the story of a star-crossed couple named Maddy and Davy. On May 2, 2016, BrooklynVegan premiered a stream of the full album. A music video was created for "Madeline".

Critical reception

At Metacritic, which assigns a weighted average score out of 100 to reviews from mainstream critics, the album received an average score of 76, based on 4 reviews, indicating "generally favorable reviews".

James Christopher Monger of AllMusic gave the album 3.5 out of 5 stars, describing it as "a densely packed, atmosphere-driven conceptual piece with one foot in the underground rap scene and the other in the increasingly elastic indie pop realm." He added, "the two manage to find a little tenderness in their protagonists' struggles, and while it can make for some uncomfortable moments, it's never not compelling."

In June 2016, Christopher R. Weingarten of Rolling Stone named it one of the "Best Rap Albums of 2016 So Far".

Track listing

Personnel
Credits adapted from liner notes.

 Serengeti – vocals
 Yoni Wolf – vocals, production, recording, mixing
 Eddy Kwon – violin (5)
 John Horesco IV – mastering
 David J. Woodruff – design

References

External links
 

2016 albums
Serengeti (rapper) albums
Joyful Noise Recordings albums
Collaborative albums